Korytysche may refer to the following places in Ukraine:

 Korytysche, Kyiv Oblast, village in Myronivka Raion, Kyiv Oblast
 Korytysche, Lviv Oblast, village in Ivano-Frankivsk municipality, Lviv Oblast
 Korytysche, Sumy Oblast, village in Nedryhailiv Raion, Sumy Oblast
 Korytysche, Zhytomyr Oblast, village in Khoroshiv Raion, Zhytomyr Oblast